Diodora galeata, common name the cup-shaped keyhole limpet, is a species of sea snail, a marine gastropod mollusk in the family Fissurellidae, the keyhole limpets and slit limpets.

Description
The size of the shell varies between 10 mm and 20 mm.

Distribution
This marine species occurs off the Philippines and Queensland, Australia.

References

 Hedley, C., 1907. Mollusca of Mast Head Reef, Queensland. Part 2. Proc. Linn. Soc. N.S.W, 32:476-513
 Wilson, B., 1993. Australian Marine Shells. Prosobranch Gastropods. Odyssey Publishing, Kallaroo, WA

External links
 To World Register of Marine Species
 Australian Faunal Directory
 

Fissurellidae
Gastropods described in 1779